Corticaria impressa is a species of minute brown scavenger beetles native to Europe.

References

Latridiidae
Beetles described in 1790
Beetles of Europe